Gerard Maximin County (born 1960 in Port of Spain) is a Trinidadian clergyman and bishop for the Roman Catholic Diocese of Kingstown. He was ordained in 1996, and appointed bishop in 2015. In 2016, he entered into a partnership with the Archdiocese of Louisville to renovate the diocesan pastoral center, among other projects intended to aid Kingstown and other small dioceses in the area. In April 2021, following the eruption of the La Soufriere, he sent a message asking for prayers from the people of St. Vincent and the Grenadines to "bring triumph from tragedy".

References 

Trinidad and Tobago Roman Catholic bishops
Saint Vincent and the Grenadines Roman Catholic bishops
People from Port of Spain
Living people
1960 births
Roman Catholic bishops of Kingstown